Efstathios "Stathis" Sarantos (born 16 May 1952) is a Greek former water polo player who competed in the 1972 Summer Olympics and the 1978 FINA World Championship. At club level, he played for Olympiacos.

References

1952 births
Living people
Greek male water polo players
Olympiacos Water Polo Club players
Olympic water polo players of Greece
Water polo players at the 1972 Summer Olympics